Geographic Messaging Service, or GMS for short, is a new form of messaging for cell phones. It is a message associated with a geographic region that is delivered to a subscriber when they are within that region. This form of messaging extends traditional Short Messaging Service (SMS) and Multimedia Messaging Service (MMS), by allowing subscribers to send and receive SMS or MMS. Similar to SMS and MMS, GMS can be the vehicle for peer-to-peer communications, as well as for other content and marketing services. For example, a tourist organization can leave tidbits about interesting locations in New York City and have them delivered to visitors when they are nearby those locations.

The technology underlying GMS is called geofencing—detecting when a cellphone crosses a geographic fence. The term GMS was coined by researchers at Bell Laboratories.

Mobile telecommunications standards